French Cerdagne is the northern half of Cerdanya, which came under French control as a result of the Treaty of the Pyrenees in 1659, while the southern half remained in Spain (as part of Catalonia). Catalans often refer to French Cerdagne as Upper Cerdanya. It is the only French territory on the Iberian Peninsula, as it is located on the south side of the Pyrenees Range between France and Spain. For example, the Segre river, which goes west and then south to meet the Ebro, has its source in the French Cerdagne. An inadvertent result of the Treaty of the Pyrenees is the Spanish exclave of Llívia (the small uncolored area in the map) which is sovereign Spanish territory surrounded by French Cerdagne.

French Cerdagne has no special status inside France, simply forming an area within the department of Pyrénées-Orientales, unlike the Spanish part of Cerdanya, which is officially a Catalan comarca called simply Cerdanya. In France, the French area is referred to as either Cerdagne française (i.e. "French Cerdagne"), Haute-Cerdagne (i.e. "Upper Cerdagne") or just Cerdagne.

French Cerdagne has a land area of 539.67 km² (208.37 sq. miles). Its 1999 population was 12,035, resulting in a density of only 22 people per km² (58 per sq. mile).

French Cerdagne has the most cloud-free days in France, and was therefore chosen as the place to build:

 the Odeillo solar furnace  (official site), used for high-temperature scientific experiments;
 the Thémis experimental solar power plant (operated by EDF from 1983 to 1986); it is now decommissioned as a power plant, but is being used as a Cerenkov telescope for the detection of Gamma rays

Communes
Population at the 1999 French Census.

 Angoustrine-Villeneuve-des-Escaldes (Catalan: Angostrina) – pop. 549
 Bolquère (Catalan: Bolquera) – pop. 730 (779 at 2004 census)
 Bourg-Madame (Catalan: La Guingueta d’Ix) – pop. 1,166 (1,198 at 2004 census)
 Dorres – pop. 219
 Égat (Catalan Èguet) – pop. 494 (475 at 2004 census)
 Enveitg (Catalan Enveig) – pop. 621
 Err (Catalan Er) – pop. 551
 Estavar – pop. 409
 Eyne (Catalan Eina) – pop. 127 (161 at 2004 census)
 Font-Romeu-Odeillo-Via (Catalan Font-Romeu, Odelló i Vià) – pop. 2,003
 La Cabanasse (Catalan La Cabanassa) – pop. 622 (756 at 2004 census)
 Latour-de-Carol (Catalan La Tor de Querol) – pop. 367
 Llo – pop. 133
 Mont-Louis (Catalan Montlluís) – pop. 270
 Nahuja (Catalan Naüja) – pop. 63
 Osséja (Catalan Osseja) – pop. 1,282
 Palau-de-Cerdagne (Catalan Palau de Cerdanya) – pop. 424 (496 at 2004 census)
 Planès – pop. 27
 Porta – pop. 98
 Porté-Puymorens (Catalan Portè) – pop. 147
 Saillagouse (Catalan Sallagosa) – pop. 820
 Sainte-Léocadie (Catalan Santa Llocaia) – pop. 140
 Saint-Pierre-dels-Forcats (Catalan Sant Pere dels Forcats) – pop. 213
 Targassonne (Catalan Targasona) – pop. 203 (194 at 2004 census)
 Ur – pop. 308
 Valcebollère (Catalan: Vallsabollera) – pop. 49

See also
 Cerdanya
 Northern Catalonia

References

Literature
 Peter Sahlins, Boundaries. The Making of France and Spain in the Pyrenees (Berkeley: Univ. of California Press, 1989).

External links 
 L'Alta Cerdanya in Catalan Encyclopaedia.
 Tourism in Cerdagne

Linguistic rights
Cerdagne
Geography of Pyrénées-Orientales

fr:Cerdagne#Cerdagne française
it:Alta Cerdagna